Las constituyentes is a 2011 documentary film directed by Oliva Acosta about the 27 women, deputies and senators, who participated in the Constituent Cortes. A document that recovers the voice of the first women who acceded to the Parliament after the dictatorship of Francisco Franco, it gathers the history and the political participation of women in Spain. The documentary is subtitled in Spanish, English and French.

The film premiered at the 2011 Seville European Film Festival (SEFF).

Synopsis
The assembly has the testimony of 14 of the 27 parliamentarians who participated in the Constituent Legislature, because some of them have not been able to participate and seven of them have already died; among them the civil war hero Dolores Ibarruri. In their discussions they remember the reasons why they entered politics and analyze the evolution of the situation of women in Spain.

According to critics, "one of the most powerful moments of the documentary is a meeting between these veterans and a group of active politicians of different political parties such as former minister Carmen Alborch, Carmen Calvo or Bibiana Aído, deputy of the Canary Coalition, Ana Oramas, the deputy of the PP Sara Dueñas, the member of the General Council of the Judiciary Margarita Uría, Montserrat Surroca of CiU or Inés Sabanés de IU ".

Participants

 Asunción Cruañes Molina
  Belén Landáburu González
  Soledad Becerril Bustamante
 María Dolores Calvet Puig
 Ana María Ruiz-Tagle
 Esther Tellado Alfonso
 Nona Inés Vilariño Salgado
 María Dolores Pelayo Duque
  Carlota Bustelo García del Leal
 Castro Garcia Virtues
 María Izquierdo Rojo
 Rosina Lajo Pérez
 Amalia Miranzo Martínez
 Mercedes Moll de Miguel

They could not participate

 Gloria Begué Cantón
  María Teresa Revilla López
 Immaculate Sabater Llorens
 Juana Arce Molina
 Elena María Moreno González

Those that are no longer alive

 Dolores Blanca Morenas Aydillo (1937-1998)
 Palmira Plá Pechovierto (1914-2007)
  Dolores Ibárruri Gómez (1895-1989)
 Marta Ángela Mata Garriga (1926-2006)
  Pilar Brabo Castells (1943-1993)
 María Victoria Fernández Spain and Fernández Latorre (1925-1999)
 Carmen García Bloise (1937-1994)
 Maria Rúbies i Garrofé (1932-1993)

References

External links
 
 

2011 films
2010s Spanish-language films
2010s feminist films
Spanish transition to democracy